The 2010–11 Slovenian Basketball League (official: 2010–11 Telemach League) was the 20th season of the Premier A Slovenian Basketball League, the highest professional basketball league in Slovenia. Krka Novo Mesto won its 4th national championship.

Teams for the 2010–11 season

Regular season

P=Matches played, W=Matches won, L=Matches lost, F=Points for, A=Points against, Pts=Points

Champions standings

P=Matches played, W=Matches won, L=Matches lost, F=Points for, A=Points against, Pts=Points

League for place 9-11

P=Matches played, W=Matches won, L=Matches lost, F=Points for, A=Points against, Pts=Points

Playoffs

Finals

Awards

Regular Season MVP
  Gregg Thondique (Hopsi Polzela)

Season MVP
  Gregg Thondique (Hopsi Polzela)

Finals MVP
  Zoran Dragić (Krka)

Weekly MVP

Regular season

Note

 – Co-MVP's were announced.

Second round

Statistics leaders 

| width=50% valign=top |

Points

|}
|}

| width=50% valign=top |

Assists

 

|}
|}

External links
Official Basketball Federation of Slovenia website 

Slovenian Basketball League seasons
Slovenia
1